John Lind is the name of:

 John Lind (barrister) (1737–1781), English lawyer and political writer
 John Lind (politician) (1854–1930), US politician
 John Lind (female impersonator) (1877–1940), female impersonator

See also
Jon Lind, American songwriter
John Lynde, Mayor of Canterbury